Gagneur is a surname. Notable people with the surname include:

 Marie-Louise Gagneur (1832–1902), French writer and activist
 Yannick Gagneur (born 1980), French basketball player

See also
 Gagner (surname)
 Gagneux